Football Club Viktoria Plzeň is a Czech professional football club based in Plzeň. They play in the Czech First League, the top division of football in the country.

As runners-up in the 1970–71 Czechoslovak Cup, the club gained the right to play in the following season's Cup Winners' Cup, as winners Spartak Trnava also won the championship and played in the European Cup. In 2010, they played in the UEFA Europa League after winning the 2009–10 Czech Cup.

The club won the Czech league for the first time in 2011, and participated in the 2011–12 UEFA Champions League group stage, during which they won their first Champions League match, earning five points and qualifying for the Round of 32 in the 2011–12 UEFA Europa League. The club won their second Czech league title in the 2012–13 season.

In 2013–14, the club participated in the UEFA Champions League group stage and finished third. They then reached the round of 16 in UEFA Europa League before being eliminated by Lyon.

History

Early history
In 1911, Jaroslav Ausobský, an official of the state railways, filed a request for the establishment of a new football club in Plzeň. In August 1911, the newly formed club Viktoria played their first match, losing 7–3 against Olympia Plzeň.

For the first 18 years of its existence, Viktoria Plzeň was a purely amateur club, although in 1922–23, they took their first foreign trip to Spain, where they won six out of nine matches. In June 1929, an extraordinary meeting of members agreed to go professional and enter the national professional league. Viktoria finished their first season in seventh place, but the very next season, improved and reached second place, which meant a first-ever promotion to the First League. In the 1934–35 Czechoslovak First League, Viktoria finished in fourth place and subsequently played in the 1935 Mitropa Cup, the top European club competition at the time. Two matches against Juventus brought Viktoria to the attention of European football at large. They drew 3–3 at home but lost 5–1 in Turin.

Viktoria played without success in the First League, being relegated for the 1938 season but returning to top competition the next year. The outbreak of World War II interrupted competition, notably through the absence of teams from Slovakia. In 1942, Viktoria fell again into the divisions, but again returned to the top league the next year, where they would remain until 1952. That same year, the club changed its name to Sokol Škoda Plzeň. For nine years they remained in the divisions, struggling to return to the First League, and in 1961, now under the name of Spartak Plzeň, achieved that promotion. The club was relegated and promoted frequently between the top two tiers until 1972, when as Škoda Plzeň they settled in the First League for eight years.

In 1971, Viktoria won the Czech Cup by drawing lots after the two-legged final ended 4–4 on aggregate and 5–5 in a limited penalty shootout against Sparta Prague B. They lost 7–2 on aggregate in the Czechoslovak Cup final against Slovak Cup winners Spartak Trnava, but as Trnava had won the league title that season, Viktoria was the country's entrant to the next season's European Cup Winners' Cup. The club's greatest honor is elimination in the first round by Bayern Munich, 7–2 on aggregate. From 1980 until the division of Czechoslovakia 13 years later, Viktoria moved frequently between the top two tiers again.

Recent history

In 1992, the club returned to its historical name FC Viktoria Plzeň and the very next season, advanced to the first league, where it remained until 1999.

In the first years of the new millennium, Viktoria was owned by a foreign investor – Italian Football Company Ltd EAST. This situation lasted until March 2005, when 100% of the club's shares were purchased by local interests. The summer of 2005 also brought back relations with the Czech motor company Škoda, which had previously been the club's name sponsors.

On 18 May 2010, Viktoria won the Czech Cup final 2–1 against Jablonec, and returned to European competitions via the 2010–11 UEFA Europa League. Viktoria entered in the third qualifying round against Beşiktaş and held them 1–1 at home before losing 3–0 away.

Viktoria won its first ever league championship in 2010–11, finishing with 69 points to Sparta Prague's 68. The club therefore qualified for a play-off to the 2011–12 UEFA Champions League, in which they defeated Copenhagen 5–2 on aggregate. Viktoria were placed in Group H alongside reigning champions Barcelona and Milan, and reached third place in the group by recording a victory over BATE Borisov. This saw the club drop into the 2011–12 UEFA Europa League in the round of 32, where they lost 4–2 on aggregate to Schalke 04 after extra time.

The club's Stadion města Plzně was also rebuilt in 2011. On 11 June 2011, Viktoria celebrated together with fans in the courtyard of the Pilsner Urquell brewery for a centennial anniversary. In January 2012, the club held a festive gala for its centenary, and voted current midfielder Pavel Horváth as its greatest player of all-time.

The 2011–12 season saw Viktoria finish in third place in the league, three points behind champions Slovan Liberec, to qualify for a third consecutive Europa League campaign. Starting in the second qualifying round, the club advanced past Metalurgi Rustavi of Georgia and Ruch Chorzów of Poland to set up a play-off against the Belgian club Lokeren, in which Viktoria advanced on away goals after a 2–2 aggregate draw. The club finished first in Group B, ahead of the tournament's reigning champions Atlético Madrid. In the round of 32, Viktoria were drawn against Napoli and won 3–0 away and 2–0 at home to advance to the last 16, where they played Fenerbahçe. Viktoria lost the home leg 1–0, and in the away leg (which was played behind closed doors due to the Istanbul club's fans' recent conduct) drew 1–1, resulting in their elimination. Viktoria won the Czech league for a second time in the 2012–13 season.

Off-field
In 2017, the club installed a dugout in the shape of a beer can after a deal with a local beer sponsor.

Historical names
1911 – SK Viktoria Plzeň (Sportovní klub Viktoria Plzeň)
1949 – Sokol Škoda Plzeň
1952 – Sokol ZVIL Plzeň (Sokol Závody Vladimíra Iljiče Lenina Plzeň)
1953 – DSO Spartak LZ Plzeň (Dobrovolná sportovní organizace Spartak Leninovy závody Plzeň)
1962 – TJ Spartak LZ Plzeň (Tělovýchovná jednota Spartak Leninovy závody Plzeň)
1965 – TJ Škoda Plzeň (Tělovýchovná jednota Škoda Plzeň)
1993 – FC Viktoria Plzeň (Football Club Viktoria Plzeň, a.s.)

Players

Current squad
.

Out on loan

Notable former players

Player records in the Czech First League
.
Highlighted players are in the current squad.

Most appearances

Most goals

Most clean sheets

Managers

Rudolf Krčil (1963)
Vlastimil Chobot (1967–68)
Karel Kolský (1969–70)
Jiří Rubáš (1970–75)
Tomáš Pospíchal (1975–77)
Jaroslav Dočkal (1977–78)
Svatopluk Pluskal (1978–79)
Josef Žaloudek (1979–??)
Václav Rys
Zdeněk Michálek (1993–95)
Jaroslav Hřebík (1995–96)
Antonín Dvořák (1996–97)
Petr Uličný (1997–99)
Milan Šíp (1999)
Luboš Urban (1999–2000)
Miroslav Koubek (Oct 2000 – 01)
Petr Rada (Dec 2001 – Oct 2002)
Zdeněk Michálek (Oct 2002 – May 2003)
František Cipro (May 2003 – May 2004)
Martin Pulpit (May 2004 – May 2005)
Zdeněk Michálek (May 2005 – April 2006)
František Straka (April 2006 – May 2006)
Michal Bílek (July 2006 – Sept 2006)
Stanislav Levý (Oct 2006 – April 2008)
Karel Krejčí (April 2008 – May 2008)
Jaroslav Šilhavý (July 2008 – Oct 2008)
Pavel Vrba (Oct 2008 – Dec 2013)
Dušan Uhrin Jr. (Dec 2013 – Aug 2014)
Miroslav Koubek (Aug 2014 – Aug 2015)
Karel Krejčí (Aug 2015 – May 2016)
Roman Pivarník (May 2016 – April 2017)
Zdeněk Bečka (April 2017 – June 2017)
Pavel Vrba (Jun 2017 – Dec 2019)
Adrián Guľa (Dec 2019 – May 2021)
Michal Bílek (May 2021 – present)

History in domestic competitions

Seasons spent at Level 1 of the football league system: 24
Seasons spent at Level 2 of the football league system: 4
Seasons spent at Level 3 of the football league system: 0
Seasons spent at Level 4 of the football league system: 0

Czech Republic

History in European competitions

The following is a list of the all-time statistics from Plzeň's games in the three UEFA tournaments it has participated in, as well as the overall total. The list contains the tournament, the number of seasons (S), games played (P), won (W), drawn (D) and lost (L). The statistics include qualification matches.
As of 2 August 2018.

Honours

National

Czech First League
Winners (6): 2010–11, 2012–13, 2014–15, 2015–16, 2017–18, 2021–22
Runners-up: 2013–14, 2016–17, 2018–19, 2019–20

Czech Cup
Winners (1): 2009–10
Runners-up: 2013–14, 2020–21

Czech Supercup
Winners (2): 2011, 2015
Runners-up: 2010, 2013, 2014

Czech 2. Liga
Winners (1): 2002–03

Club records

Czech First League records
Best position: 1st (2010–11, 2012–13, 2014–15, 2015–16, 2017–18, 2021–22)
Worst position: 16th (2000–01, 2003–04)
Biggest home win: Plzeň 7–0 Ústí nad Labem (2010–11), Plzeň 7–0 Teplice (2020–21)
Biggest away win: Ústí nad Labem 0–5 Plzeň (2010–11)
Biggest home defeat: Plzeň 1–5 Drnovice (1997–98), Plzeň 0–4 Příbram (2003–04), Plzeň 0–4 Slavia Prague (2006–07), Plzeň 0–4 Ostrava (2007–08), Plzeň 0–4 Olomouc (2011–12)
Biggest away defeat: Ostrava 6–0 Plzeň (2005–06)

References

External links
* Official club website 

 
Football clubs in the Czech Republic
Association football clubs established in 1911
Czechoslovak First League clubs
Czech First League clubs